Cisalpine is an adjective referring to the Italian side of the Alps. If may refer to:

 Cisalpine Gaul, an ancient Roman province
 Cisalpine Republic, a Napoleonic client state
 Cisalpine, a subdialect of Vivaro-Alpine within the Occitan language
 Cisalpine languages, a sub-family of Romance languages spoken in Northern Italy
 Cisalpine, native speakers of Cisalpine languages in Northern Italy

See also
 Cisalpin (disambiguation)
 Cisalpino
 Cisalpinism, a view in the Roman Catholic Church about the extent of papal authority